State Highway 94 (SH 94) is a state highway in the U.S. state of Texas that runs  between Trinity and Lufkin.  This route was designated on April 21, 1924, from Trinity to Groveton. On May 4, 1925, it extended to Lufkin. On September 26, 1954, SH 94 was extended from old US 59 to new US 59 in Lufkin.

Major junctions

References

094
Transportation in Trinity County, Texas
Transportation in Angelina County, Texas